The 2014 Liga Premier, also known as the Astro Liga Premier for sponsorship reasons, is the ninth season of the Liga Premier, the second-tier professional football league in Malaysia.

The season was held from 24 January 2014.

The Liga Premier champions for 2014 season was PDRM. The champions and runners-up were both promoted to 2015 Liga Super.

Changes from last season

Team changes

To Liga Super

Promoted from 2013 Liga Premier
 Sarawak
 Sime Darby
Relegated from 2013 Liga Super
 Felda United
 Negeri Sembilan

From Malaysia FAM League

Relegated to 2014 Malaysia FAM League
 Betaria
 Kuala Lumpur
Promoted to 2014 Liga Premier
 Penang
 PBAPP

Rule changes

 A total of 4 foreign players can be registered by Premier League teams, including at least one player from AFC countries. A maximum of 3 foreign players can be fielded at one time in a match. The announcement was made by FAM during the exco meeting in November 2013, following a decision to upgrade the foreign players quota from 2 in 2013 to 3 in the April 2013 meeting.

Name Changes
 Pos Malaysia were renamed to DRB-Hicom
 Johor FA were renamed to Johor Darul Takzim II

Teams

A total of 12 teams are contesting the league, including 8 sides from the 2013 season, two promoted from the 2013 Malaysia FAM League and two relegated from 2013 Liga Super.

On 27 May 2013, Penang earned promotion from the 2013 Malaysia FAM League. They returned to the second division after being absent for 2 years. This is the second season that Penang are in the Premier League. This was followed by neighbours, PBAPP. The two teams replace Betaria and Kuala Lumpur who were all relegated to the 2014 Malaysia FAM League.

Felda United and Negeri Sembilan were relegated from 2013 Liga Super. They are replacing Sarawak and Sime Darby who get promotion to 2014 Liga Super.

Team Summaries

Team locations

Stadium

Personnel and sponsoring

Coaching changes

Foreign players

League table

Results
Fixtures and Results of the Liga Premier 2014 season.

Week 1

Week 2

Week 3

Week 4

Week 5

Week 6

Week 7

Week 8

Week 9

Week 10

Week 11

Week 12

Week 13

Week 14

Week 15

Week 16

Week 17

Week 18

Week 19

Week 20

Week 21

Week 22

Season statistics

Top scorers

Hat-tricks

Scoring

 First goal of the season: Muhamad Daud Zo for PBAPP against Felda United FC (24 January 2014)
 Fastest goal of the season: 1 Minute – Titi Buengo for Penang against Perlis (10 February 2014)
 Largest winning margin: 8 goals
 Felda United 8-0 UiTM (20 June 2014)
 Highest scoring game: 9 goals
 PBAPP 2–7 Kedah (9 May 2014)
 Most goals scored in a match by a single team: 8 goals
 Felda United 8-0 UiTM (20 June 2014)
 Most goals scored in a match by a losing team: 2 goals
 DRB-Hicom 3–2 Johor Darul Ta'zim II (10 February 2014)
 Perlis 2–3 Penang (10 February 2014)
 Sabah 3–2 Kedah (7 March 2014)
 UiTM 2–4 Felda United F.C. (24 March 2014)
 Felda United 3–2 DRB-Hicom (11 April 2014)
 Johor Darul Ta'zim II 3–2 Penang (11 April 2014)
 PBAPP 2–7 Kedah (9 May 2014)

Transfers
For transfers see: List of Malaysian football transfer 2014

See also
 2014 Liga Super
 2014 Liga FAM
 2014 Piala Malaysia
 2014 Piala FA

References

Malaysia Premier League seasons
2
Malaysia
Malaysia